The North Korean economic reform refers to the program of reform and restructuring of the North Korean economy. Economic reforms have been increasing in the last years, particularly after Kim Jong-un came to power in 2012.

History 
Economic reforms in North Korea has its roots to the 1970s, when North Korean government agencies, provincial governments and military units were unofficially granted permission to establish their own companies. Number of such companies have increased dramatically since the 2000s.

Economic impact 
North Korea's economic growth under Kim Jong-un is estimated to be ranging from 1 percent to 5 percent. North Korea expert Andrei Lankov has said that North Korea's real growth rate is 3–4%.

Foreign encouragement 
Economic reforms in North Korea has been encouraged by China. While visiting Pyongyang in June 2019, Chinese paramount leader Xi Jinping said that Kim Jong-un had “initiated a new strategic line of economic development and improving people’s livelihoods, raising socialist construction in the country to a new high tide.”

See also 

 Chinese economic reform

References 

Economy of North Korea
Economic liberalization